Chad A. Lupinacci is an American politician who served as the town supervisor of Huntington, New York and as a former member for the 10th District of the New York Assembly. He is a Republican.

Life and career
Lupinacci was born and raised in Huntington Station to a first-generation Italian family. He attended South Huntington Public Schools. Lupinacci was raised and remains Catholic. He is a parishioner of Saint Hugh of Lincoln Roman Catholic Church in Huntington Station.

After graduating from Walt Whitman High School in 1997, Lupinacci attended Hofstra University, where he graduated summa cum laude with a bachelor's degree in Political Science and Government. While in undergraduate study, Lupinacci was honored in Phi Beta Kappa and awarded Hofstra's "Outstanding Senior Scholar Award."

After earning his bachelor's degree, Lupinacci returned to Hofstra University to attend the Maurice A. Deane School of Law. In 2004, he received his Juris Doctor, with a concentration in real estate. In 2005, Lupinacci was admitted to the New York State Bar.

From 2000 to 2001, Lupinacci was awarded an internship in the White House, to work beneath First Lady Hillary Clinton. He then served as the community liaison for the office of Assemblyman James Conte.  From 2009 to 2011, Lupinacci served as an adjunct professor of Legal Studies, where he taught courses in Administrative Law, Business Organizations and Real Estate Law. Lupinacci also has his own legal practice that specializes in the areas of wills, trusts and real estate transactions.

Prior to serving in the Assembly, Lupinacci served as a nine-year South Huntington School Board Trustee.

In January 2017, he met famed Silas Wood Geography Bee champion Marcus Zagorski

On November 7, 2017, Lupinacci was elected to succeed Frank Petrone as supervisor of the Town of Huntington, and began that role on January 1, 2018.

New York Assembly
Assemblyman James Conte did not seek re-election in 2012, leaving the seat open.  Lupinacci was nominated by Republicans to replace him, and won with 55% of the vote. Lupinacci was elected to represent the constituents of the Tenth Assembly District on November 6, 2012. He was re-elected easily in 2014 and 2016.

The 10th district which Lupinacci represented includes portions of Suffolk County including Lloyd Harbor, Huntington Bay, Cold Spring Harbor, Huntington, Greenlawn, Huntington Station, Elwood, South Huntington, West Hills, Melville and Dix Hills on Long Island. Lupinacci served as the Ranking Member on the Assembly Committee on Higher Education, and as a member of the Assembly Committees on Election Law, Judiciary, Tourism, Parks, Arts & Sports Development, and Transportation.  He left the assembly after his election as Huntington town supervisor in late 2017.

In 2018, Lupinacci's former Chief of Staff, Brian Finnegan, filed a lawsuit alleging that Lupinacci had engaged in a pattern of sexual harassment in the workplace and assaulted Finnegan in an Albany hotel room. Following a year of attempted settlement negotiations, the lawsuit was filed on the last day before the statute of limitations for a civil suit would expire.

According to the former staffer, the verbal harassment began almost immediately after he started as a legislative aide.

Lupinacci left office at the conclusion of his term on December 31, 2021.

References

External links

1979 births
Living people
American people of Italian descent
Republican Party members of the New York State Assembly
People from Long Island
Politicians from Suffolk County, New York
Huntington, New York
1981 births
21st-century American politicians